Ingber is a surname. Notable people with the surname include:

Donald E. Ingber (born 1956), American cell biologist and bioengineer
Elliot Ingber (born 1941), American guitarist
Jeff Ingber (1935–2019), British table tennis player
Mandy Ingber (born late 1960s), American yoga instructor and former actress